The International Business Communication Standards (IBCS) are practical proposals for the design of business communication published for free use under a Creative-Commons-Lizenz (CC BY-SA). In most cases, applying IBCS means the proper conceptual, perceptual and semantic design of charts and tables.

Requirements 
Business Communication meets the IBCS Standards if it complies with the three rule sets comprising the three pillars of IBCS:
 Conceptual rules help to clearly relay content by using an appropriate storyline. They are based on the work of authors such as Barbara Minto. They owe wide acceptance to their scientific, experimental, or practical experience basis.  They correspond with SUCCESS - a rule set for business communication SAY and STRUCTURE. 
 Perceptual rules help to clearly relay content by using an appropriate visual design. They are based on the work of authors such as William Playfair, Willard Cope Brinton, Gene Zelazny, Edward Tufte and Stephen Few. Again, these rules owe wide acceptance to their scientific, experimental, and/or practical experience basis.They correspond with the SUCCESS rule sets EXPRESS, SIMPLIFY, CONDENSE, and CHECK.
 Semantic rules help to clearly relay content by using a uniform notation (IBCS Notation). They are based on the work of Rolf Hichert and other contributors of the IBCS Association. As they are manifested by convention, semantic rules must first be more widely accepted to become a standard.They correspond with the SUCCESS rule set UNIFY.

IBCS Notation 
IBCS Notation is the designation for the semantic rule set suggested by IBCS. IBCS Notation covers the unification of terminology (e.g. words, abbreviations, and number formats), descriptions (e.g. messages, titles, legends, and labels), dimensions (e.g. measures, scenarios, and time periods), analyses (e.g. scenario analyses and time series analyses), and indicators (e.g. highlighting indicators and scaling indicators).

IBCS Association 
The review and further development of the IBCS is an ongoing process controlled by the IBCS Association. The IBCS Association is a non-profit organization that publishes the Standards for free and engages in extensive consultation and discussion prior to issuing new versions. This includes worldwide solicitation for public comment. Release of IBCS Version 1.0: The active members accepted the released Version 1.0 of the IBCS Standards at the General Assembly of June 18, 2015 in Amsterdam. Current themes of the further development of the IBCS standards were discussed at the Annual Conference in Warsaw of June 3, 2016. The version 1.1 of the standards was confirmed by the active members at the Annual Conference in Barcelona of June 1, 2017. More than 80 professionals of 12 counties attended the Annual Conference.
The Annual Conference in London of June 8, 2018 took place at the Headquarters to The Institute of Chartered Accountants in England and Wales.
The Annual Conference 2019 was in Vienna. The Keyspeaker Yuri Engelhardt talked about "The language of graphics and visual notations." The Annual Conference 2020 and 2021 were held virtually. More than 200 participants from many countries attended these conferences. The Annual Conference 2022 were held hybrid in Berlin and online, about 300 participants from 44 countries attend this conference.

References 
 Playfair, William: The Commercial and Political Atlas, 1786
 Brinton, Willard Cope: Graphic Methods for Presenting Facts, 1914
 Zelazny, Gene: Say it with Charts, McGraw Hill Professional, 2001
 Tufte, Edward: The Visual Design of Quantitative Information, 2. edition, 2011
 Few, Stephen: Show Me the Numbers, 2. edition, 2012
 Shneiderman, B.: The Eyes Have It: A Task by Data Type Taxonomy for Information Visualizations. In:Proceedings of the IEEE Symposium on Visual Languages, S. 336–343, Washington
 Hichert, Faisst, et al: International Business Communication Standards, IBCS Version 1.1, 2017
 Hichert, Rolf and Faisst, Jürgen: Solid, Outlined, Hatched – How visual consistency helps better understand reports, presentations and dashboards, IBCS Media, 2019

Itemization

External links 
 www.ibcs.com – International Business Communication Standards
 www.ibcs.com/standards - SUCCESS - a rule set for the design of business communication
 http://www.graphomate.com/ - How to create IBCS charts with SAP
 http://www.zebra.bi - How to create IBCS charts with Excel

Communication
Notation